András Petőcz (born August 27, 1959 in Budapest) is a Hungarian writer and poet.

Life
Petőcz began his career in literary life in 1981. He was the chief editor for over two years of the art periodical Jelenlét (Presence), which was published by the Faculty of Humanities at the Eötvös Loránd University of Sciences in Budapest, and soon became a significant forum on contemporary literature. He graduated from Eötvös Loránd University of Sciences in 1986 where he studied Hungarian Literature and Language-History.

After obtaining his degree he was an assistant at Gorkii State Library for a short time, and then worked as an editor for longer and shorter periods on literary magazines. Since then he has been working as a professional writer.

Petőcz has taken part in several international literary and art festivals, e.g. in Paris (1986), in Tarascon (France, 1988), in Marseille (1995). He has been working as a university and college lecturer for seven years.

Work

Poetry

Petőcz has published around 25 books, including poems for adults and children, essays, fiction and reviews. Petőcz poetry volumes include the book A tenger dícsérete (1994), and the poetry collections Meduza (2000) and A napsütötte sávban (2001). He also published a "collected poems book" under the title Majdnem minden (Almost everything, 2002).

He also edited several volumes of avant-garde literature and worked as organizer for a variety of events showcasing experimental literature. He also was the editor of "Medium Art", a Selection of Hungarian Experimental Poetry. In the eighties he was one of the "leaders" of Hungarian avant-garde poetry, having begun to work on sound poetry during the period. His visual and concrete poetry is well known. Béla Vilcsek writes about his poetry: "Legends and extremes accompany András Petőcz on his home ground. He always has a dichotomy, either wanting to pay respects to classicism or to modernity, conservatism or avant-garde, sonnet or free verse, tradition or the new. In his mid-thirties, he already commands an authoritative reputation with his life-work, in both its quantity and quality. There are few writers like this among those in his field."

Prose
The more than six prose books András Petőcz has published contain essays and reviews such as Idegenként, Európában (As a Stranger in Europe, 1997), a series of short stories called Egykor volt házibarátaink (Once We Had House Friends, Chapters from a Family Saga, 2002), and two novels A születésnap (The Birthday, 2006) and Idegenek (Strangers, 2007).

The Birthday
The Birthday is a novel that tells a family story spanning 30 years. Tony the little boy narrator is special in that he does not get older. He remains a child as he looks at events around him. Everyone is preparing for the birthday of the head of the family while they look at the Big Photo Album. The 30 years of the novel brings to life what happened from the early sixties to the nineties, how people lived in Central Europe and refers to the change of system in Hungary in 1989. The little boy narrator, still waiting in vain for his father at the beginning of the celebrations, becomes a man due to his missing father and his memories. He tells the family stories "in one breath" using spoken expressions and personal remarks.

Károly D. Balla writes about A születésnap: “The author, who is himself on the threshold of dreams, redeems historical and family tragedies with angelic good humour, and what might make an adult grumpy and ill is rendered tolerable by the imagination of childhood memories and the genuineness of the hope in them.”

Strangers
In this novel, an eight-year-old girl learns to lie in order to survive. It is not clear exactly where and when Strangers takes place. Somewhere in Europe, or the edges of Europe, but it could be somewhere in America or Asia. Perhaps in the 20th century, but it could be the first decade of the 21st century. As the subtitle says, the story takes place "thirty minutes before the war".  The little girl maintains human values even in a world of terror and oppression. Terrible things happen to small children on a daily basis. Across the border is the free world where there are no soldiers in charge, where you can travel freely. The free world might be reached through a rat infested tunnel. The novel deals with events that have already taken place in the 21st century and turns concrete events into fiction. It elaborates the terrorist atrocity of Beslan in Russia.

György C. Kálmán writes about Idegenek:  “In the world of the novel – it is difficult to interpret Petőcz’s work any other way – everyone is an outsider. As they are in the outside world (suggests the novel). For in this world (in the novel and outside) the fact of being an outsider means to be vulnerable to a deadly threat (or is itself a threat), it means oppression, helplessness and determined opposition. Being an outsider is not just about a different use of language (or using a different language), clothes, skin colour or customs, but is embodied primarily in oppression and power – wherever the outsider may be. To be more precise, the defenceless and those in power are both outsiders for each other, and no matter who is in either position, for everyone else too.”

Prizes
Petőcz has received numerous literary prizes and awards for his work in literature, including the Lajos Kassák Literary Prize in 1987, which he received for his experimental poetry from the distinguished avantgarde literary journal Magyar Műhely (Hungarian Workshop).

Petőcz's poem "Európa metaforája" (Europe, metaphorically) won the Robert Graves Prize for best Hungarian poem of the year 1990.

In 1996 Petőcz was awarded the Attila József Prize by the cultural part of the Hungarian government as an official recognition of his work to date.

He is also a UNESCO-Aschberg Laureate, having been granted a bursary in 2006 for the residency program at CAMAC (Centre d’Art. Marnay Art Centre) in Marnay-sur-Seine. to write a new novel.

In 2008 he received the Sándor Márai Prize awarded by the Hungarian Ministry of Education and Culture, for his novel Idegenek (Strangers).

In 2021 Petőcz was awarded the IPTRC Prize by the INTERNATIONAL POETRY TRANSLATION AND RESEARCH CENTRE and the GREEK ACADEMY OF ARTS AND LETTERS and 
THE JOURNAL OF RENDITION OF INTERNATIONAL POETRY [Multilingual] as an official international recognition of his poetry.

Participations
András Petőcz has been to numerous writers’ residences and has been a guest at numerous international writers' meetings. He spent three months in the United States in 1998, where he took part in an international writers’ seminar within the framework of the International Writing Program (IWP) in Iowa City. While there, he took part in events with about 25 writers from all over the world, including Israeli prose writer Igal Sarna and the brasilien writer Bernardo Carvalho.

From the IWP invitation, Petőcz contributed to several readings, including in New York, San Francisco and Portland, Maine. Similarly, he spent a month in 2001 at the Yaddo Art Center in Saratoga Springs, New York, where, among others, he met Rick Moody, the American prose writer.

In 2002 he moved to Lille, France, for four years with his family and contributed to the work of the French journal and literary circle Hauteurs.

Starting in January 2007, he spent three months at CAMAC and introduced his new novel Idegenek (Strangers) in French. In August 2007, he was invited to Switzerland by the Ledig-Rowohlt Foundation and spent three weeks at the Château de Lavigny International Writers' Residence.

In September 2011, he was invited to the International Literaturfestival Berlin, and also introduced his novel Idegenek (Strangers) in German.

In May 2013, he participated in the "Biennale International des poetes en Val-de-Marne" in France, and introduced his poemes in French. Starting in June 2013 he spent two months at Villa Yourcenar Residency, and participated in the artistic life of the Villa.

Starting in October 2022 he spent one months at Residências Internacionais de Escrita Fundação Dom Luís I, and worked on his new novel, and talked about his poetry.

In February 2023, she spent one month in Austria, in Krems, at the residence "Literaturhaus Niederösterreich", and worked on his new poetry book, and talked about his works  in the Collegium Hungaricum in Vienna.

Notes

 
 Petőcz and a part of his novel "Idegenek" in the Jewish newspaper "Szombat" (Saturday)
 The International Authors and Writers Who's Who, Editor: M.J. Shields, FIInfSc, MITI, Cambridge, England, 1993 
 1998: The International Writing Program (András Petőcz)
 Béla Vilcsek: Andras Petőcz, monograph, published by Kalligram, 2001, 
 Petőcz's Biography on the homepage of Belletrist Association (in Hungarian)
 Petőcz's interview about the novel "Idegenek" (Strangers) on the homepage of the Hungarian Cultural Ministry (in Hungarian)
 Petőcz's interview in the Hungarian political weekly "168 óra" about what it means to be a "stranger" (in Hungarian)
 Petőcz's biography and works (audio) on the homepage of the Museum of Literature in Budapest.
  
 Új magyar irodalmi lexikon (New Hungarian Literary Encyclopedia), editor: Laszlo Peter, published by Akadémiai Kiadó, Budapest, 1994.  .
 Medium-Art, Selection of Hungarian Experimental Poetry, editors Zoltan Frater and Andras Petőcz, published by Magvető, 1990, Budapest, 
 András Petőcz - László Sary: Közeledések és távolodások - Approaching and Departing, Sound poetry record/disc, published by Hungaroton, 1990, SLPX 31392, 2009, HCD 31392 https://web.archive.org/web/20071130000631/http://www.camac.org/ver2/proto/residences_petocz_andras.htm
 András Petőcz's poems and biography in English: The Maecenas Anthology of Living Hungarian Poetry, editor: István Tótfalusi, published by Maecenas Könyvek, Budapest, 1997, 
 András Petőcz's poems and biography in English: In Quest of the Miracle Stag: The Poetry of Hungary, editor: Adam Makkai, published by The International Association of Hungarian Language and Culture, Budapest, 2003,

References

External links

 András Petőcz's homepage
 András Petőcz's page on the HUNLIT literature database
 Andras Petőcz's poems in English - In praise of the sea
 Andras Petőcz's poems in English - in a row of sunlight
 Hungarian poetry selected by Andras Petőcz
 András Petőcz: A Change of Guard in Writing (about the Hungarian Poetry)
 1998 IWP Author Interviews, András Petőcz (audio and video)
 
 Iowa Audio interview with Andras Petőcz about writing prose versus poetry
 Iowa Audio interview with Andras Petőcz and others about the book and the technologie
 The homepage of "Palatinus" (Petőcz's publisher)
 The Hungarian Literature Online about the book of András Petőcz: In a row of sunlight
 It is good to be a stranger – interview with award winning Hungarian writer Andras Petöcz.
 András Petőcz's reading in English in Budapest
 András Petőcz: Strangers (Excerpt from the novel in The Hungarian Quarterly)

1959 births
Writers from Budapest
Hungarian male poets
20th-century Hungarian poets
20th-century Hungarian male writers
21st-century Hungarian poets
21st-century Hungarian male writers
Living people
International Writing Program alumni
Attila József Prize recipients